The Grand Opening (TGO) is the musical alias of the Swedish musician John Roger Olsson. TGO releases records on the Hamburg, Germany based label Tapete Records. In July 2013 Tapete Records announced that TGO will release the new album Don't Look Back Into The Darkness on October 11.

Biography 
The Grand Opening started as four piece based in Ånge, Sweden in 1999. After being active as a band for two years, singer and songwriter John Roger Olsson moved to Stockholm and restarted the band. During the years, The Grand Opening has had many different members for both live shows and recordings. Their first release was the free digital EP Location which was released by It's a Trap! Records in 2005.

Discography 
Albums
 2006: This Is Nowhere to Be Found (Tapete Records)
 2008: Beyond the Brightness (Tapete Records)
 2010: In the Midst of Your Drama (Tapete Records)
 2013: Don't Look Back Into the Darkness (Tapete Records)

Singles and EPs
 2005: Location EP (It's a Trap! Records)
 2006: "Don't Drop Off/So Be It" 7"
 2006: "Get Out" CDS
 2010: "Be Steady" CDS

Compilation appearances
Something Must Break Volume One
It's a Trap! readers Companion Volume Two
SPEX CD #69
Tapete 100
Did You D:qliq?
Acoustic Songs 2
This is Tapete Records!

References

External links 
 Official site
 Official twitter account
 Official facebook page
 Tapete Records The Grand Opening site
 The Grand Opening Discogs Discography

Swedish musicians
Tracker musicians
Living people
Sadcore and slowcore groups
Tapete Records artists
Year of birth missing (living people)